, abbreviated typically as  or , is a private university in Hachiōji, Tokyo, Japan. In 2014, the Japanese Ministry of Education, Culture, Sports, Science and Technology (MEXT) designated Soka University as one of Japan's Top Global Universities. The university has 8 faculties with a total of around 8,000 students, 400 of whom are international students.

History
Soka University opened to undergraduate students on April 2, 1971, with its graduate school opening in April 1975.  Since the school's founding, more than 50,000 students have graduated from Soka University.

Soka University of America is a related school founded in 2001, located in Aliso Viejo, California, which offers both graduate and undergraduate degrees.

Educational philosophy 
Soka University's educational philosophy was established by Tsunesaburō Makiguchi, the first president of the Soka Gakkai (then called the Soka Kyoiku Gakkai, or Value-creating Education Society), who had worked as the principal of an elementary school in Japan. Makiguchi published the book "The System of Value-Creating Pedagogy" based on his belief that the purpose of education is the students' happiness, and emphasized humanistic education. This educational philosophy was shared by his successor, Jōsei Toda, who had served as a primary school teacher. Toda's successor, Daisaku Ikeda, describes his goal as carrying out the dreams of Makiguchi and Toda.

"Soka" is a Japanese term meaning "value creation". In 1971, when Daisaku Ikeda founded Soka University, the school established the following founding principles:

  Be the highest seat of learning for humanistic education.
  Be the cradle of a new culture.
  Be a fortress for the peace of humankind.

Since 2010, the university has also adopted the official motto .

Organization

Faculties

 Faculty of Economics
 Department of Economics
 Faculty of Business Administration
 Department of Business Administration
 Faculty of Law
 Department of Law
 Faculty of Nursing
 Department of Nursing
 Faculty of Science and Engineering
 Department of Information System Engineering
 Department of Science and Engineering for Sustainable Innovation
 Faculty of International Liberal Arts
Department of International Liberal Arts
 Faculty of Letters
 Department of Humanities
 Faculty of Education
 Department of Education
 Department of Primary Education

Graduate schools
 Law
 Teacher Education
 Law and Letters
 Engineering

Honors Program
 Global Citizenship Program (GCP)
 School for Excellence in Educational Development (SEED)
 Language Education

Research institutes
 Institute of Oriental Philosophy

Honorary doctorates
As of 2015, Soka University had awarded 365 honorary doctorates and honorary professorships, primarily to international figures in academia and culture. In April 1993, Mikhail Gorbachev traveled to Tokyo together with his wife Raisa to receive an honorary doctorate from Soka University in recognition of his efforts for world peace. A cherry tree was planted at the university in their honor during their visit. Rosa Parks visited Soka University in 1994 to deliver a lecture, and was bestowed an honorary doctorate at that time for her contributions to civil rights. When Nelson Mandela visited Soka University in 1995, he was awarded an honorary doctorate for his lifelong work to promote human rights. In 1996, the university awarded an honorary doctorate to Fidel Castro in recognition of his efforts to establish exemplary health care and education systems for his nation's people. In 2008, an honorary doctorate was awarded to a professor at Moscow State University, Mihail Sokolov, a medical robotics scientist.

Soka Women's College

See also

List of universities in Japan
List of universities in Tokyo
List of junior colleges in Japan

References

External links
Soka University of Japan (English portal)
Sōka Women's College 

Sōka University
Super Global Universities
Private universities and colleges in Japan
Buddhist universities and colleges in Japan
Japanese junior colleges
Educational institutions established in 1971
1971 establishments in Japan
Soka Gakkai